On 2 August 2014, after Lebanese security forces arrested an al-Nusra Front commander, fighters from al-Nusra Front and ISIL surrounded Lebanese Army checkpoints in Arsal before attacking them and storming the northeastern town's police station, where they took at least 16 policemen hostage. The militants then proceeded to take control of the town, and captured two soldiers who were freed by the military later in the day. The fighting continued into the next day and left 30 militants, 10 soldiers and two civilians dead. 25 soldiers were wounded and 13 were missing and presumed captured. Two of the missing soldiers were rescued the same day.

On 4 August, the death toll had risen to 17 soldiers, 50 civilians and 50 militants. 86 soldiers had been wounded and the number of missing had reached 22, while 135 civilians and 15 militants were wounded. Two of the dead civilians were infant Syrian refugees. The military had advanced and captured the technical institute building, which was seized by the militants the previous day, as the town came under heavy shell fire from multiple directions.
 In the evening, the Army also managed to capture Ras al-Serj hill.

On 5 August, the military was attempting to capture two government buildings, while three soldiers and three policemen were released by the militants. During the day's fighting, the ISIL commander for the Arsal area was reportedly killed, while al-Nusra forces retreated from the town. In the evening, a 24-hour cease-fire started.

On 6 August, another three soldiers were released, while 10 soldiers and 17 policemen remained as captives.

By 7 August, a fragile truce was established as ISIL forces also retreated from the town and redeployed along the border with Syria. Their hideouts there were subsequently bombed by the Syrian Air Force, resulting in dozens of wounded militants. On 22 July 2017 Hezbollah controlled 90% of Jroud arssal.

Two days later, the Lebanese Army entered Arsal in full force and re-established control over checkpoints that the militants had previously seized, while another soldier died of his wounds, bringing the military death toll to 18, which was updated to 19 by 12 August. 60 militants were also confirmed dead, as well as 42 civilians. The total number of civilians wounded was estimated at 400.

References

External links
 The Battle for Arsal
 

Conflicts in 2014
Syrian civil war spillover in Lebanon
Military operations of the Syrian civil war involving the Syrian government
Military operations of the Syrian civil war involving the al-Nusra Front
Military operations of the Syrian civil war involving the Islamic State of Iraq and the Levant
Battles in 2014